The Next Indian general election in Maharashtra is expected to be held by 2024.

The major contenders in the state are National Democratic Alliance (NDA) and United Progressive Alliance (UPA). NDA consists of the Bharatiya Janata Party and the Balasahebanchi Shiv Sena whereas UPA consists of the Shiv Sena (Uddhav Balasaheb Thackeray), Nationalist Congress Party and Indian National Congress. 

The 2019 Indian general election resulted in National Democratic Alliance winning 41 seats out of 48 seats.

After the results of 2019 Maharashtra Legislative Assembly election, Shiv Sena declined to support the BJP to form the government, demanding an equal share in power which was promised by BJP. Shiv Sena also demanded the post of Chief Minister for 2.5 years according to 50-50 promise. But BJP declined such promise and eventually ended breaking ties with one of their oldest ally Shiv Sena.

The 2022 Maharashtra political crisis began on 21 June 2022 in the Indian state of Maharashtra when Eknath Shinde, a senior Shiv Sena leader, along with several other MLAs of the Maha Vikas Aghadi (MVA) coalition moved to Surat in the Bharatiya Janata Party (BJP}-governed Gujarat, throwing the coalition into a crisis. The group later moved to Guwahati in another BJP-governed state, Assam. Shiv Sena leader Sanjay Raut accused BJP of causing the revolt within Shiv Sena and attempting to topple the MVA-coalition government, implicitly mentioned later in a remark by BJP's  Sushil Modi. On 29 June, Uddhav Thackeray, Chief Minister of Maharashtra, resigned from the post as well as a MLC member while speaking live on social media ahead of a no-confidence motion on 29 June 2022. The resignation of Thackeray saw the cancellation of the floor test, with Shinde taking stake of the government as the Chief Minister and Devendra Fadnavis taking oath as Deputy Chief Minister. On 10th October the Election Commission of India allotted new party name of the two factions of the Shiv Sena. Balasahebanchi Shiv Sena  and Shiv Sena (Uddhav Balasaheb Thackeray).

Results by Alliance

References

Next Indian general election by state or union territory
Indian general elections in Maharashtra